Francis Edward Fitzherbert-Stafford, 12th Baron Stafford, DSO (28 August 1859 – 18 September 1932) was an English peer and British Army officer, holding the title Baron Stafford. His lifetime marked the point where the Stafford barony first came into contact with Fitzherbert as a surname.

Background
Francis Edward's father was Basil Thomas Fitzherbert and his mother was Emily Charlotte Stafford-Jerningham. It was through his mother's side of the family that he gained the Stafford barony; his uncle Fitzherbert Edward Stafford-Jerningham, 11th Baron Stafford had died without issue in 1913. Fitzherbert-Stafford also descended from Genoese nobility as his great grandfather was John Vincent Gandolfi, 12th Marquis Gandolfi. A Roman Catholic, he was educated at Beaumont College, Windsor.

Military Career and Public Offices
Fitzherbert was commissioned in 1877 into the Lancashire Militia, which from 1881 became the 3rd (Militia) Battalion of the Royal Lancaster Regiment. He was promoted to major on 5 February 1900, and the following week left with the battalion to serve in the Second Boer War. He fought in South Africa from his arrival in March 1900 to 1902, and was awarded the Distinguished Service Order (DSO) in 1900. He became honorary lieutenant-colonel in 1901, and renounced his militia commission in 1903. He was also commissioned into his native county's Staffordshire Yeomanry in 1885, and promoted Major in that regiment in 1898.

In the First World War he served purely on home defence duties, becoming Colonel commanding the Staffordshire Volunteer Regiment of the Volunteer Training Corps.

He was a Deputy Lieutenant and Justice of the Peace for Staffordshire and hereditary Lord High Steward of the Borough of Stafford.

Marriage and later life
On 20 April 1903 Fitzherbert-Stafford married Dorothy Hilda Worthington, the daughter of Albert Octavius Worthington. Together the two did not parent any children. He died at the family seat of Swynnerton Hall at age 73.

Notes

References
"Francis Edward Fitzherbert, 12th Baron Stafford". ThePeerage.com. Retrieved on 2008-03-21.

"Francis Edward Fitzherbert-Stafford, 12th Baron Stafford". GeneAll.net. Retrieved on 2008-03-21.
"Fitzherbert Stafford-Jerningham, 11th Baron Stafford". GeneAll.net. Retrieved on 2008-03-21.

1859 births
1932 deaths
British Army personnel of the Second Boer War
British Army personnel of World War I
King's Own Royal Regiment officers
English justices of the peace
British Militia officers
People from Stafford
English Roman Catholics
Companions of the Distinguished Service Order
Deputy Lieutenants of Staffordshire
Staffordshire Yeomanry officers
People educated at Beaumont College
Barons Stafford (1640 creation)